Andre Begemann and Albano Olivetti were the defending champions but chose not to defend their title.

Antonio Šančić and Tristan-Samuel Weissborn won the title after defeating Alexander Erler and Lucas Miedler 7–6(10–8), 4–6, [10–8] in the final.

Seeds

Draw

References

External links
 Main draw

Sparkassen ATP Challenger - Doubles
2021 Doubles